The Student School,  stylised THESTUDENTSCHOOL, is an alternative high school in the Toronto District School Board founded in 1979. It has approximately 160 students and generally offers 11th and 12th grade academic courses. It is in the same building as Western Technical-Commercial School and Ursula Franklin Academy.

The school is based loosely on the principles of participatory democracy. It allows students to vote on significant school policies and actions taken on by the school community in bi-weekly general assemblies. Notably, students and teachers alike receive one vote. Furthermore, students are encouraged to take an active role in community and global politics through various committees and organizations present at school.

It is well known for its support of social justice causes and boycotts. For example, it has a yearly auction that works as a fundraiser for women living in shelters over the holiday season. Also it is home to a community-run garden, a kitchen collective that provides subsidized lunches and free breakfasts to students, and a number of student-run associations.

The school has a number of unique course offerings that correspond to various standard course codes recognized by the Toronto District School Board, for example, "a history of imperialism and protest," "women and gender studies," or "alternative economic models."

Much like several other alternative schools, teachers are on a first name basis with students.

References

External links
School website

High schools in Toronto
Schools in the TDSB
Alternative schools
Educational institutions established in 1979
1979 establishments in Ontario